Starting Over is the fourth and final studio album by the 1970s power pop band Raspberries. It peaked at #143 on the Billboard pop album chart in 1974.  The LP generated the #18 Billboard pop single "Overnight Sensation (Hit Record)," while a second single, "Cruisin' Music" did not chart. This was the first album by the Raspberries to feature songs with profanity. Those songs were “Starting Over” which featured the word "fucking" once and the song “Party’s Over” which featured the word "shit" twice.

Stylistically, Starting Over represented a more aggressive arena rock/hard rock sound compared to previous albums in a way reminiscent of The Who, which was one of the groups' biggest influences. The album also included softer ballads such as "Rose Coloured Glasses" and "Cry".

This album was re-released on CD as part of Power Pop Volume 2, which also contains their album Side 3.

Starting Over featured a new line-up with Michael McBride (drums), who had drummed with Carmen and Bryson in their previous band in the late '60s, Cyrus Erie, and Scott McCarl (bass, vocals). Jim Bonfanti and Dave Smalley had left the band the previous year.

Bruce Springsteen's drummer Max Weinberg has said that he based his early drum style (particularly on the Springsteen album Darkness on the Edge of Town) on Raspberries drummer Michael McBride's work in this album, while Springsteen himself has also mentioned several times in live performances that the title track is one of the greatest pop songs ever written.

John Lennon, a Raspberries fan, particularly liked the song "Overnight Sensation."  He was present for part of the recording of the Starting Over LP and, although not credited on the LP, is said to have assisted with the mix, including "Overnight Sensation."

Critic Mark Deming of the All Music Guide praised the album as "a fine farewell from one of the best American pop bands of their era, though they didn't know it would be their last album when they were making it."

Track listing
 "Overnight Sensation (Hit Record)" (Carmen)  – 5:34 / Lead vocal: Carmen
 "Play On" (Carmen, McCarl)  – 3:01 / Lead vocal: McCarl
 "Party's Over" (Bryson)  – 3:14 / Lead vocal: Bryson
 "I Don't Know What I Want" (Carmen)  – 4:13 / Lead vocal: Carmen
 "Rose Coloured Glasses" (McCarl)  – 3:38 / Lead vocal: McCarl
 "All Through the Night" (Carmen, McBride)  – 4:30 / Lead vocal: Carmen
 "Cruisin Music" (Carmen)  – 3:09 / Lead vocal: Carmen
 "I Can Hardly Believe You're Mine" (Carmen, McCarl)  – 3:34 / Lead vocal: Carmen
 "Cry" (Carmen, McCarl)  – 2:41 / Lead vocal: McCarl
 "Hands on You" (Bryson, McCarl)  – 2:22 / Lead vocal: Bryson and McCarl
 "Starting Over" (Carmen)  – 4:10 / Lead vocal: Carmen

Timings and credits taken from the original Capitol issue (ST-11329).

Charts

Band members
Eric Carmen — vocals, rhythm guitar, piano
Wally Bryson — vocals, lead guitar
Scott McCarl — vocals, bass
Michael McBride — drums

References

Raspberries (band) albums
1974 albums
Albums produced by Jimmy Ienner
Albums recorded at Record Plant (New York City)
Capitol Records albums